José Aurelio Gonzales-Vigil Bentín (born 1 March 1996) is a Peruvian footballer who plays for Cultural Santa Rosa, as a forward.

External links

References

1996 births
Living people
Peruvian footballers
Association football forwards
Esther Grande footballers
FBC Melgar footballers
Club Alianza Lima footballers
Ayacucho FC footballers
Unión Huaral footballers
FC Carlos Stein players
Peruvian Primera División players
Peruvian Segunda División players
2015 South American Youth Football Championship players